Deux Frères was a tartane that the French Navy had requisitioned in March 1798 at Marseille and commissioned as a transport. A British division under the command of Commodore Sir Sidney Smith in  captured her on 18 March 1799 at the siege of Acre in 1799. She was one of a flotilla of seven vessels and Smith took all into the Royal Navy.

At the time of her capture Deux Frères was armed with four guns and had a crew of 23 men. One of the seven captured vessels was lost in a gale at the siege; the lost vessel was almost certainly Deux Freres as the other six have a readily identifiable subsequent history.

Citations

References
 

1790s ships
Ships of the French Navy
Captured ships
Ships of the Royal Navy
Maritime incidents in 1799
Shipwrecks in the Mediterranean Sea